Pouteria bracteata is a species of plant in the family Sapotaceae. It is endemic to Colombia.

References

bracteata
Endemic flora of Colombia
Endangered plants
Taxonomy articles created by Polbot